The Pitt is a  1987 one-shot comic book written by John Byrne and Mark Gruenwald, and illustrated by Sal Buscema and Stan Drake. It was published by Marvel Comics as part of its New Universe line. The story depicts the total destruction of the city of Pittsburgh, Pennsylvania, as a result of the careless actions of the wielder of the Star Brand and its immediate 12-hour aftermath. The Pitt was the first full graphic novel published for Marvel's New Universe series.

Major characters
 Starbrand (Ken Connell) – a young aspiring superhero and native of Pittsburgh bearing a mysterious sigil granting him potentially infinite power. Though the instigator of the Pitt, his presence in the story is limited, appearing in only a few panels without dialog or being named.
 The Witness (Nelson Kohler) – a man who went into a coma precisely when the White Event occurred and subsequently died. His intellect reincorporating as a ghost-like psychic projection, he cannot be seen or heard, neither can he interact physically with the world in any way, but he can travel anywhere at will to observe events. He is compelled by a strange pull to witness people manifesting paranormal abilities.
 MacIntyre (Mac) Browning – Colonel in the Army's Defense Intelligence Agency called in to assess and handle the situation.
 Jenny Swensen (Spitfire) – government agent and operator of the M.A.X. Armor, which is used to investigate the scene and try to rescue survivors.

Background
The storyline of The Pitt begins in issue #12 of Star Brand. In the previous issue, Ken Connell used his power to become the world's first costumed superhero. Now enjoying growing fame, he makes an appearance at a local Pittsburgh comic-book convention. A recurring enigmatic foe known only as the Old Man ambushes Connell at the show, destroying the building and killing hundreds of by-standers. After escaping, Connell realizes that he was able to read the Old Man's mind during the encounter, and thus learned that he is a centuries-old human who bears a brand like his own and was driven insane by it. Fearing the same thing may happen to him, Connell resolves to rid himself of the star brand immediately by flying to the far side of the Moon and dissipating nearly all its energy. However, as he begins the flight he has second thoughts about possibly being stranded so far from medical aid if anything should go wrong, and instead sheds the Brand ten miles (16 km) above the Earth. The issue ends with a massive ball of light erupting from Ken Connell.

Synopsis
The destruction of Pittsburgh occurs at exactly 6:06 pm Eastern Standard Time on December 22, 1987. The spontaneous release of energy caused by the Star Brand instantly and silently disintegrates all matter in a massive spherical volume of space, 50 miles in diameter, centered ten miles (16 km) above ground level. Where the sphere intersects the ground, a perfectly symmetrical concave void in the Earth's crust 15 miles (24 km) deep (far enough to expose the hot mantle) is made. The city of Pittsburgh and its immediate suburbs lie within this region, thus these settlements and nearly half a million people are destroyed instantly. Thousands more are killed in neighboring areas by violent winds several times greater than hurricane strength, as the atmosphere rushes into the sudden vacuum.

The abrupt silent flash of white light can be seen for hundreds of miles, but with the immediate cessation of communication from the area no one knows what has actually happened. The federal government sends in a military reconnaissance team led by Colonel Browning to assess the situation, assisted by Jenny Swensen and her Spitfire robot suit. Faced with the enormity of the disaster and the possibility of it being a Soviet strike, Browning institutes a severe security lockdown, ordering Swensen to abandon attempts to rescue survivors and shooting down a news helicopter that tries to investigate. Swensen ignores Browning's orders to make no contact with civilians and retrieves a car holding a family of survivors who were pulled into the crater by the winds and are slowly sinking into the mire of debris and liquid accumulating in its depths. She rescues the family, but some of the "Pitt Juice" seeps through her armor and impairs her systems. When she returns, Jenny learns how severely Browning has sealed up the area and his increasingly paranoid attempts to cover-up the truth of the event. She abandons Browning to try to help as many people as she can, and is threatened with summary execution for doing so. However, the search proves fruitless, and Browning allows her to return without incident after conceding that the tragedy is beyond the military's ability to cover-up, or indeed human society's ability to comprehend.

Parallel to the main storyline, the Witness observes the unfolding of events, from Ken Connell's initial cause (which he mourns being unable to prevent) and a possibly hallucinated encounter with the vengeful souls of all those who died in the Pitt. At one point, Jenny Swensen sees and attempts to communicate with him, one of the few times a living person has been able to do so.

The crater itself is referred to as The Pitt, as is the event that created it. Within the fictional universe, it is occasionally also referred to as The Black Event (in contrast to the earlier White Event).

The destruction of Pittsburgh (and the unsolved mystery of its cause) lead to a dramatic rise in international tension and a vast militarization of American society, including the suspension of some civil rights. Many cities suffer dramatic drop in population as residents fear becoming victims of another "Pitt". New York and surrounding areas in particular suffer severe economic downturn as, in addition to general depopulation, ash and smoke drifting Eastward from the Pitt have a negative environmental impact.

The Pitt led into the following mini-series The Draft and then The War, and ultimately the conclusion of the entire New Universe.

References

External links 
 

1987 comics debuts
Comics set in Pittsburgh
Defunct American comics
Marvel Comics one-shots
Marvel Comics titles
New Universe